"Love You No More" is the second single issued by French music producer and DJ Bob Sinclar from his studio album Born in 69 (which was released worldwide on 14 July 2009).  The song features Shabba Ranks and samples Manu Chao's Bongo Bong.

Track listings
."Love You No More" (Original Club Version) – 5:28  
."Love You No More" (Nicola Fasano Remix Club Version) – 7:30  
."Love You No More" (Chuckie Remix) – 5:35  
."Love You No More" (Jean Guy Schreiner Remix) – 7:14

Charts

Notes and references

Bob Sinclar songs
2009 singles
Yellow Productions singles
2009 songs
Ministry of Sound singles
Songs written by Bob Sinclar